Liu Hua (born 1 June 1961) is a Chinese actor. He is noted for his roles as Zhen Chengzong in Under The Temptation, for which he received Best Supporting Actor Award nomination at the 4th Macau International Movie Festival.

Life

Early life
Liu Hua was born and raised in  Beijing. He graduated from Central Academy of Drama, majoring in acting despite not attending Highschool.

Acting career
Liu made his acting debut in Romance of the Three Kingdoms, playing Pan Feng, a general under Han Fu.

In 1996, he acted in the historical television series Eastern Zhou Dynasty Various Nations directed by Shen Haofang, playing the role of Yi Ya.

Liu Hua's first film role as Brother Dao in Ning Hao's film Crazy Stone (2006). At the same year, he had a supporting role in the film Big Movie, which starred Huang Bo and Yao Chen.

In 2008, he had a cameo appearance in Almost Perfect. He was cast in the film Lost and Found, playing Lao Xing, a policeman. He co-starred with Fan Wei and Ju Wenpei in Set Off as Qun Tou.

In 2009, he appeared in The Founding of a Republic, Panda Express, and Gasp. That same year, he had a minor role in The Eloquent Ji Xiaolan, a historical television series starring Zhang Guoli, Zhang Tielin and Wang Gang.

In 2010, he was cast in the lead role of Linghu Youwei in the Filmko Pictures Beijing and Shenzhen Golden Shores Films's Don Quixote, directed by Ah Gan. He participated in Love Tactics, alongside Chie Tanaka, Qin Hailu, and Chen Xiaodong.

In 2011, he filmed in Wuershan's The Butcher, the Chef and the Swordsman, opposite Masanobu Andō, Zhang Yuqi, and You Benchang. He appeared in Wong Jing's Treasure Hunt, a comedy film starring Cecilia Cheung and Ronald Cheng. He had a minor role as Cheng Ziqing in Huang Jianxin and Han Sanping's The Founding of a Party.

In 2012, he acted with Tao Hong, Guo Tao, Lei Jiayin, and Cheng Yuanyuan in Ning Hao's Guns and Roses. He was cast in the romantic comedy film Dinner Party with Liang Guanhua, Mo Xiaoqi, and Han Tongsheng. He earned his nominated for Best Supporting Actor Award at the 4th Macau International Movie Festival for his performance in Under The Temptation.  He played the lead role with Vitas and Eva Huang in One Night To Be Star. He appeared in Happiness Me Too, a romantic comedy film starring Sha Yi, Joe Chen, and Aya Liu.

In 2013, he starred in a television series called Hello 30s with Du Chun and Ma Su. He participated in the romantic comedy television series Wedding Strings, alongside Gao Yuanyuan and Huang Haibo. He co-starred with Xu Fan and Wang Baoqiang in the comedy film I am Director.

In 2014, he had a supporting role as Dragon King of the East Sea in the shenmo film The Monkey King, which starred Donnie Yen, Chow Yun-fat, Aaron Kwok, Joe Chen, and Peter Ho.

Personal life
Liu Hua and his wife have a daughter.

Filmography

Film

Television

Awards

References

External links

1961 births
Living people
Male actors from Changchun
Central Academy of Drama alumni
Chinese male film actors
Chinese male television actors
21st-century Chinese male actors
20th-century Chinese male actors